Carlos Alberto Correia Fortes (born 20 October 1968), commonly known as Cao, is a Portuguese retired footballer who played as a defensive midfielder.

Club career
Cao was born in Praia, Cape Verde. After unsuccessfully emerging through FC Porto's youth academy he went on to play 12 seasons in the two major levels of Portuguese football, representing Rio Ave FC (second division), F.C. Tirsense (Primeira Liga), Leça FC (first and second tiers), S.C. Salgueiros (both), S.C. Campomaiorense (both) and F.C. Felgueiras (second).

He retired from professional football in 2003 with totals of 284 matches and 11 goals, going on to spend the rest of his career in amateur football, which included a third spell with Leça. Subsequently, he worked as a graphic designer.

International career
Cao was part of the Portuguese under-20 team that won the 1991 FIFA World Youth Championship, with the competition being held on home soil. In 2002 it was revealed that he had in fact been born in 1968, meaning he was crowned Youth World Champion at the age of 22.

References

External links

1968 births
Living people
Sportspeople from Praia
Cape Verdean footballers
Portuguese footballers
Association football midfielders
Primeira Liga players
Liga Portugal 2 players
FC Porto players
Rio Ave F.C. players
F.C. Tirsense players
Leça F.C. players
S.C. Salgueiros players
S.C. Campomaiorense players
F.C. Felgueiras players
Portugal youth international footballers
Portugal under-21 international footballers